Samoa requires its residents to register their motor vehicles and display vehicle registration plates. Current plates are Australian standard 372 mm × 134 mm, and use Australian and New Zealand stamping dies, as zeroes now have a slash through them (e.g. 52Ø9, 128Ø7).

References

Samoa
Transport in Samoa
Samoa transport-related lists